Impatiens minor, also known by its common name lesser balsam, is a species from the genus Impatiens.

References

Flora of India (region)
minor